Ytu zeus is a species of myxophagan beetle in the genus Ytu. It was discovered in 1973.

References

Myxophaga
Beetles described in 1973